Azikiwe Kellar (born ) is a Trinidad and Tobago male  track cyclist, and part of the national team. He competed in the team sprint and 1 km time trial event at the 2009 UCI Track Cycling World Championships.

References

External links
 Profile at cyclingarchives.com

1976 births
Living people
Trinidad and Tobago track cyclists
Trinidad and Tobago male cyclists
Place of birth missing (living people)
Competitors at the 2010 Central American and Caribbean Games